Yolanda Yvonne Montes Farrington (born January 3, 1932), better known by her stage-name Tongolele, is an American-Mexican dancer, actress and vedette.

Early life
Yolanda Yvonne Montes Farrington, was born in Spokane, Washington, United States, on January 3, 1932. Her father, Elmer Sven Móntes, descended from a Spanish father and a Swedish mother. Her mother, Edna Pearl Farrington, of English father and French mother. Her maternal grandmother, Molly (Maeva), was from Tahiti.
As a child, she danced for the International Ballet of San Francisco, California as part of a Tahitian Revue.

In 1947, she moved to Mexico and was hired as a dancer by Américo Mancini, a theater impresario. She also appeared in the famous Cabaret Tívoli in Mexico City. Her stage name, "Tongolele", came after mixing African and Tahitian words.

Career
Her career was sheltered by theatrical success in the main theaters and cabarets of Mexico City. Tongolele boosted the success of the "Exoticas", a group of vedettes that caused sensation in Mexico in the late 1940s and early 1950s. Although other vedettes that became popular at the time (like "Kalantán", "Bongala" and Su Muy Key) appeared, none reached the levels of popularity of Tongolele.
Yolanda was baptized by Mexican journalist Carlos Estrada Lang as "The Queen of Tahitian Dances", as each night she congregated a wide male audience who adored her perfect silhouette and feline movements that marked an era in Mexico.

She made her film debut in 1948 in the film Nocturne of Love, starring the actress Miroslava Stern. In 1948, she starred in the film ¡Han matado a "Tongolele"!, directed by Roberto Gavaldón. The plot was developed in the theater Folies Bergère of Mexico City. At another level of the plot, several envious people attempted to assassinate her. The film premiered on September 30, 1948.

As a guest, she starred in El rey del barrio (1949) and Kill Me Because I'm Dying! (1951) and the musical Música de siempre (1956).

In 1966, she returned to the cinema and appeared in the terror film The Panther Women. In 1968 she was in the film El crepusculo de un dios, directed and carried out by Emilio Fernández.

In 1971, Tongolele played in the Mexican-American co-production Isle of the Snake People. In the film, she appeared alongside the American actor Boris Karloff. The plot of the film was located on a small island in the middle of the ocean where some beautiful young women are transformed into blue-faced man-eating zombies. Tongolele played the role of Kalea, the dancer with the snake.
In the mid-1960s, CBS recorded a disc titled "Tongolele sings for you" which included 10 songs.

With the rise of Mexico City's nightlife in the 1970s and the rise of the vedettes, Tongolele resumed her career in nightclubs and movies, as well as appearing on television shows. In 1984 she debuted in telenovelas in a special performance in the melodrama La pasión de Isabela.

In 2001 she reappears in Mexican television in the telenovela Salomé.

Between 2011 and 2013, Tongolele participated in the musical stage play Perfume of Gardenia.

In 2012, the vedette returned to the cinema with a brief appearance in the film El fantástico mundo de Juan Orol.

Personal life

In 1956, she married Cuban Joaquin Gonzalez in New York City, who accompanied her until his death. In 1976, Joaquín suffered cardiac problems and he was given a pacemaker. On December 22, 1996 he died.
With him, Tongolele had two children in 1950, Ruben and Ricardo (twins).

Filmography

Films
 Nocturne of Love (1948)
¡Han matado a "Tongolele"! (1948)
El rey del barrio (1949)
Kill Me Because I'm Dying! (1951)
 Chucho the Mended (1952)
 The Mystery of the Express Car (1953)
Pensión de artistas (1956)
Música de siempre (1956)
The Panthera Women (1967)
El crepúsculo de un Dios (1968)
Isle of the Snake People (1971)
Las fabulosas del reventón (1981)
Las noches del Blanquita (1981)
Las fabulosas del reventón II (1982)
Teatro Follies (1983) 
El fantástico mundo de Juan Orol (2012)

Television
La pasión de Isabela (1984)
Salomé (2001)

References

Bibliography
 Su, Margo; Leduc, Renato (1989) Alta Frivolidad (High Frivolity), México, ed. Cal y Arena, 
 García Hernández, Arturo (1998) No han matado a "Tongolele" (They have not killed "Tongolele"), México, ed. La Jornada Ediciones, 
 Agrasánchez Jr., Rogelio (2001) Bellezas del Cine Mexicano (Beauties of the Mexican Cinema), México, ed. Archivo fílmico Agrasánchez,

External links
 
 Las Cruces Sun-News – NewsBank, April 10, 2008
 L.A. Times Archives, April 3, 1990

1932 births
American film actresses
American stage actresses
American female dancers
American dancers
American emigrants to Mexico
American people of English descent
American people of French descent
American people of Spanish descent
American people of Swedish descent
American people of French Polynesian descent
American vedettes
Golden Age of Mexican cinema
Living people
Mexican female dancers
Mexican film actresses
Mexican stage actresses
Mexican telenovela actresses
Mexican vedettes
Mexican people of American descent
Mexican people of English descent
Mexican people of French descent
Mexican people of Spanish descent
Mexican people of Swedish descent
Actresses from Spokane, Washington
20th-century American actresses